Shelkar or Shekar, (Tibetan: , "white crystal") also called New Tingri, is the administrative centre for Tingri County, Shigatse Prefecture in southern Tibet Autonomous Region.

Location 
The town lies 7 km off the Friendship Highway between Lhatse and Tingri, at an altitude of about 4,300 metres (approx. 14,107 feet), at the southern foot of 5,260 m high Gyatso La. It is approximately 60 km north-west of Mount Everest and just over 50 km from the Nepali border in the Tibet Autonomous Region of China.

Landmarks 
Shelkar is famous for the Shelkar Chode Monastery, a Gelug monastery which was completely destroyed but is being restored. Despite being founded in 1266 by a Kagyu lama, it has been a Gelugpa monastery since the 17th century, and formerly had some 400 monks. Although, destroyed by the Red Guards during the Cultural Revolution, the assembly hall has been rebuilt, and there is an active branch monastery in Boudhanath, Nepal.

The old Shekar Dorje dzong, or fort, is above the new town and used to enclose Shekar Chode. The ruins of the old Dzong are located on the hill  behind the monastery.

Gateway to Everest 
The early British expeditions to Mount Everest in 1921, 1922 and 1924 all stopped at Shelkar Dzong on their way from Darjeeling to the northern side of Everest.

Footnotes

References

External links
 Photograph of Shekar Dzong in 1924 at The Bentley Beetham Collection

Populated places in Shigatse
Township-level divisions of Tibet
Buddhist monasteries in Tibet
Buddhist temples in Tibet
1266 establishments in Asia
Tingri County